Tragédie en musique (musical tragedy), also known as tragédie lyrique (lyric tragedy), is a genre of French opera introduced by Jean-Baptiste Lully and used by his followers until the second half of the eighteenth century. Operas in this genre are usually based on stories from Classical mythology or the Italian romantic epics of Tasso and Ariosto. The stories may not necessarily have a tragic ending – in fact, most do not – but the works' atmospheres are suffused throughout with an affect of nobility and stateliness. The standard tragédie en musique has five acts. Earlier works in the genre were preceded by an allegorical prologue and, during the lifetime of Louis XIV, these generally celebrated the king's noble qualities and his prowess in war. Each of the five acts usually follows a basic pattern, opening with an aria in which one of the main characters expresses their feelings, followed by dialogue in recitative interspersed with short arias (petits airs), in which the main business of the plot occurs. Each act traditionally ends with a divertissement, offering great opportunities for the chorus and the ballet troupe. Composers sometimes changed the order of these features in an act for dramatic reasons.

Notable examples of the genre

Apart from Lully, the most considerable writer of tragédies en musique is Rameau, whose five works in the form are considered the culminating masterpieces of the genre. The Viking Opera Guide refers to Marc-Antoine Charpentier's tragédie Médée as "arguably the finest French opera of the seventeenth century". In the eighteenth century, Jean-Marie Leclair's lone tragédie Scylla et Glaucus has been similarly praised. Other highly esteemed exponents are André Campra (Tancrède, Idoménée), Marin Marais (Alcyone, Sémélé) and Michel Pignolet de Montéclair (Jephté).

List of works in this genre (Baroque era)

Jean-Baptiste Lully

Cadmus et Hermione (1673)
Alceste (1674)
Thésée (1675)
Atys (1676)
Isis (1677)
Psyché (1678)
Bellérophon (1679)
Proserpine (1680)
Persée (1682)
Phaëthon (1683)
Amadis (1684)
Roland (1685)
Armide (1686)
Achille et Polyxène (1687, completed by Pascal Collasse)

Works by Lully's sons

Orphée (1690) (by Louis and Jean-Baptiste the Younger)
Alcide (by Louis Lully and Marin Marais)

Paolo Lorenzani

Oronthée (1688)

Pascal Collasse

Thétis et Pélée (1689)
Énée et Lavinie (1691)
Astrée (1691)
Jason, ou La toison d'or (1696)
Canente (1700)
Polyxène et Pirrhus (1706)

Marc-Antoine Charpentier

David et Jonathas (1688)
Celse martyr (1687, lost)
Philomèle (lost)
Artaxerse (lost)
Médée (1693)

Henri Desmarets

Didon (1693)
Circé (1694)
Théagène et Chariclée (1695)
Vénus et Adonis (1697)
Iphigénie en Tauride (1704, completed by Campra)
Renaud ou la suite d'Armide (1722)

Marin Marais

Alcide (1693) (with Lully's son, Louis)
Ariane et Bacchus (1696)
Alcyone (1706)
Sémélé (1709)

Élisabeth Jacquet de La Guerre

Céphale et Procris (1694)

Charles-Hubert Gervais

Méduse (1697)
Hypermnestre (1716)

André Cardinal Destouches

Amadis de Grèce (1699)
 Marthésie, reine des Amazones (1699)
Omphale (1701)
Callirhoé (1712)
Télémaque (or Télémaque et Calypso) (1714)
Sémiramis (1718)

André Campra

Hésione (1700)
Tancrède (1702)
Télémaque (1704)
Alcine (1705)
Hippodamie (1708)
Idoménée (1712)
Télèphe (1713)
Camille, reine des volsques (1717)
Achille et Déidamie (1735)

Theobaldo di Gatti

Scylla (1701)

Jean-Féry Rebel

Ulysse (1703)

François Bouvard

Médus, roi des Mèdes (1702)

Louis Lacoste

Philomèle (1705)
Bradamante (1707)
Créuse l'athénienne (1712)
Télégone (1725)
Orion (1728)
Biblis (1732)

Toussaint Bertin de la Doué

Cassandre (1706) (with François Bouvard)
Diomède (1710)
Ajax (1712)

Jean-Baptiste Stuck

Méléagre (1709)
Manto la fée (1711)
Polydore (1720)

Joseph François Salomon

Médée et Jason (1713)
Théonoé (1715)

Jean-Baptiste Matho

Arion (1714)

Jean-Joseph Mouret

Ariane (1717)
Pirithoüs (1723)

François Francoeur and François Rebel

Pirame et Thisbé (1726)
Tarsis et Zélie (1728)
Scanderberg (1735)

Joseph-Nicolas-Pancrace Royer

Pyrrhus (1730)

Michel Pignolet de Montéclair

Jephté (1732)

Jean-Philippe Rameau

Hippolyte et Aricie (1733)
Castor et Pollux (1737)
Dardanus (1739)
Zoroastre (1749)
Les Boréades (1764)

Charles-Louis Mion

Nitétis (1741)

François Colin de Blamont

Jupiter vainqueur des Titans (1745) (with Bernard de Bury)

Jean-Marie Leclair

Scylla et Glaucus (1746)

Marquis de Brassac

Léandre et Héro (1750)

Antoine Dauvergne
Énée et Lavinie (1758)
Canente (1760)
Hercule mourant (1761)
Polixène (1763)

Jean-Benjamin de La Borde
Ismène et Isménias (1763)

Jean-Joseph de Mondonville

Thésée (1765)

Johann Christian Bach 

 Amadis de Gaule (J. C. Bach) (1779)

References
Warrack, John and West, Ewan (1992), The Oxford Dictionary of Opera, 782 pages,

External links

Opera genres
Opera terminology